David Ross Lauder VC (31 January 1894 – 4 June 1972) was a Scottish recipient of the Victoria Cross, the highest and most prestigious award for gallantry in the face of the enemy that can be awarded to British and Commonwealth forces.

Details
Lauder was 21 years old, and a private in the 1/4th Battalion, The Royal Scots Fusiliers, British Army during the First World War when the following deed took place for which he was awarded the VC.

On 13 August 1915 at Cape Helles, Gallipoli, Turkey, Private Lauder was with a bombing party retaking a sap when he threw a bomb which failed to clear the parapet and fell amongst the bombing party. There was no time to smother the bomb and Private Lauder at once put his foot on it, thereby localizing the explosion. His foot was blown off, but the remainder of the party escaped unhurt.

References

Monuments to Courage (David Harvey, 1999)
The Register of the Victoria Cross (This England, 1997)
Scotland's Forgotten Valour (Graham Ross, 1995)
VCs of the First World War: Gallipoli (Stephen Snelling, 1995)

External links
Location of grave and VC medal (Glasgow)

British Gallipoli campaign recipients of the Victoria Cross
Royal Scots Fusiliers soldiers
British Army personnel of World War I
1894 births
1972 deaths
People from Airdrie, North Lanarkshire
Recipients of the Medal for Bravery (Serbia)
British Army recipients of the Victoria Cross
Scottish amputees
Military personnel from Lanarkshire